The 1967–68 DFB-Pokal was the 25th season of the annual German football cup competition. It began on 27 January 1968 and ended on 9 June 1968. 32 teams competed in the tournament of five rounds. In the final the 1. FC Köln defeated the VfL Bochum 4–1.

Matches

First round

Round of 16

Replay

Quarter-finals

Replay

Semi-finals

Final

References

External links
 Official site of the DFB 
 Kicker.de 
 1968 results at Fussballdaten.de 
 1968 results at Weltfussball.de 

1967–68
1967–68 in German football cups